Milton French-Stewart IV (born February 20, 1964), known professionally as French Stewart, is an American actor, best known for playing Harry Solomon on the NBC sitcom 3rd Rock from the Sun. He also played Marv Murchins in Home Alone 4, Inspector Gadget in Inspector Gadget 2, and Chef Rudy on the CBS sitcom Mom.

Early life and education
Stewart was born in Albuquerque, New Mexico. His mother was a homemaker, and his stepfather was a microfilm technician. He attended Del Norte High School and also studied at the American Academy of Dramatic Arts.

Career
Stewart toured in regional theatre for seven years before breaking into television with the role of Razor Dee, a spaced-out DJ on the final season of The New WKRP in Cincinnati in 1992. He earned his Screen Actors Guild card while working for Hanna-Barbera's Shakey Quakey tour, but was later released for removing the head of his costume in front of children. In 1996, he was cast on 3rd Rock from the Sun, which lasted for six seasons, and where Stewart was noted for his talents at physical comedy and his characteristic "squinting" facial expression. During 3rd Rock's height of popularity, he appeared in numerous commercials and as a spokesperson for the beverage Clamato.

Stewart's major film credits include Stargate (1994) as Lieutenant Louis Ferretti, Leaving Las Vegas (1995), The Poison Tasters (1995), Magic Island (1995) Glory Daze (1996), McHale's Navy (1997), Love Stinks (1999), Clockstoppers (2002) as Earl Doppler, and Wedding Daze as Nathan Bennett IV. His animation credits include the voice of Bob in the short-lived animated series God, the Devil and Bob (2000), and Disney's animated series Hercules (1998) as Icarus. 

Since 3rd Rock ended in 2001, Stewart has appeared in a number of minor roles, mainly in situation comedies such as Just Shoot Me!, Becker, The Drew Carey Show, Less Than Perfect and That '70s Show (from the creators of 3rd Rock). He also starred in the WB show Charmed as a genie at the end of season 2, NCIS. He has starred in comedy films, with major roles in the direct-to-video films Home Alone 4 (2002) and Inspector Gadget 2 (2003). He guest-starred in the "Run Away Runway" episode of Disney's animated series Phineas and Ferb as fashion designer Gaston Le Mode (2008).

Stewart has appeared on MADtv and guest-starred in the Seinfeld episode "The Opposite". He can also be seen on the I Love The... series on VH1. He was an executive producer for Has Anyone Seen My Baby?, a drama on the Lifetime network that portrayed the life of a woman who lost her child on an African safari in the early 1970s. He also appeared as the "weird guy" office temp on NewsRadio.

Stewart produced and costarred in the dual role of Queen Victoria and Sigmund Freud in Watson: The Last Great Tale of the Legendary Sherlock Holmes at the Sacred Fools Theater Company, where he is a member, and was co-artistic director of its 2012–2013 season.  In May and June 2012, he appeared at Sacred Fools as Buster Keaton in the original play Stoneface: The Rise and Fall and Rise of Buster Keaton, written by his wife, Vanessa Claire Smith. In 2011, he also voiced Richard De Longpre on Allen Gregory.

On April 20, 2013, Stewart was a special guest on the NickHD television show Marvin Marvin, playing Marvin's Uncle Steve. In 2013, he joined the CBS series Mom as series regular Chef Rudy. He has also guest-starred on the TV show The Middle as Principal Cameron (2013 to May 13, 2015).

Personal life
Stewart married actress Katherine LaNasa on May 19, 1998, whom he met when she had a guest appearance on a 1996 episode of 3rd Rock from the Sun. They divorced in December 2009. He married actress Vanessa Claire Smith in June 2011. Their daughter, Helene Claire Stewart, was born on June 28, 2013.

Filmography

Film

Television

Awards and nominations
Daytime Emmy Award
2000: Nominated for Outstanding Performer in an Animated Program playing Icarus on Hercules
Ovation Awards
2011: Nominated for Lead Actor in a Play for the role of Nate in the Sacred Fools Theatre Company production of "Voice Lessons"
2011: Nominated for Featured Actor in a Play for the role of Freud/Queen Victoria in the Sacred Fools Theatre Company production of "Watson – The Last Great Tale of the Legendary Sherlock Holmes"

References

External links

The French Stewart Puppet by Rick Lyon
Yahoo Movies Biography Page

1964 births
Living people
20th-century American male actors
21st-century American male actors
American male film actors
American male television actors
Male actors from Albuquerque, New Mexico